Huelva is a city in southwestern Spain, the capital of the province of Huelva in the autonomous community of Andalusia. It is between two short rias though has an outlying spur including nature reserve on the Gulf of Cádiz coast. The rias are of the Odiel and Tinto rivers and are good natural harbors. According to the 2010 census, the city had a population of 149,410. Huelva is home to Recreativo de Huelva, the oldest football club in Spain.

While the existence of a pre-Phoenician settlement within the current urban limits since circa 1250 BC has been tentatively defended by scholars, Phoenicians established a stable colony roughly by the 9th century BC.

History

Protohistory 
At least up to the 1980s and 1990s, the mainstream view was that Huelva at first was an autochthonous Tartessian settlement (even the very same Tartessos mentioned in Greek sources) yet some later views tended to rather stress a pluri-ethnic enclave mixing natives with peoples with a mainly Phoenician and later Greek extraction. However, following the (unsystematic) finding of Phoenician archaeological materials in the Méndez Núñez-Las Monjas site, the chronology as to the Phoenician presence was reassessed. The evidence favours viewing Huelva-Onoba as a very early Phoenician colony, a development which was parallel to a certain "dismantling" of the idea of Tartessos as a mainly autochthonous archaeological culture, even though the tentative identification of Huelva with Tartessos was not discarded, but the contrary. It has been also identified with the biblical Tarshish.

First contacts in terms of local Phoenician presence have been hypothesised to have taken place as early as 1015 to 975 BCE. However remains such as those found in the Méndez Núñez-Las Monjas go so far as to likely prove a Phoenician settlement of the 9th century BCE, especially to resemble a founding date of a Tyrian settlement from the reign of Ithobaal I between 875 and 850, although the Méndez Núñez-Las Monjas' items have been also brought forward to consider a 10th-century BCE chronology in the era of Hiram I (c. 975–950). The outpost was presumably primarily populated by continental Phoenicians, with some possible addition of the likes of Eteocypriots, Cypriot Phoenicians and Sardinian Phoenicians.

As a Phoenician outpost, it facilitated local exports such as silver, copper, purple dye and salted fish, while it also served as node in the trade routes connecting the Northern Atlantic, the Southern Atlantic and the Mediterranean. Population notably increased from the mid-8th century BCE onward, possibly connected to the arrival of refugees fleeing from Tiglath-Pileser III and overall from the economic crisis and social unrest induced by the Assyrian subjugation of the Levant.

The Tartessian world entered a crisis in the 6th century BCE. The transition from the Tartessian period to the ensuing Turdetani period was presumably slow and not traumatic, degenerating from an economy based on mining to a new one rather focused on the trade of agricultural and fishing products. It was in the hands of the Turdetani at the time of conquest by Rome, and before the conquest it issued silver coins with Iberian legends.

Antiquity 

The place was called both Onoba Æstuaria or Onuba (used on coinage) during Roman times, or, simply, Onoba. It was put in the Roman province of Hispania Bætica. According to the Antonine Itinerary: it was a maritime town between the Anas, (modern Guadiana) and Bætis (modern Guadalquivir); it was on the estuary of the Luxia (modern Odiel), and on the road from the mouth of the Anas to Augusta Emerita (modern Mérida). There are still some Roman remains. Huelva hosted a mint; and many coins have been found there bearing the name of the town as Onuba.

Middle ages 
Soon after the beginning of the Umayyad invasion of the Iberian Peninsula in 711, Onuba was seized by the troops of Musa ibn Nusayr by April 712. Within a few decades, to both the broader Islamic world and the conquered locals, the town's name had corrupted to ولبة (Walba).

During the fitna of al-Andalus a weak and ephemeral taifa emerged following the demise of local Umayyad control: the bakrid taifa of Saltés and Huelva, from 1012 to 1051. In the latter year it was annexed by the more powerful Taifa of Seville, to be later occupied by the Almoravids in 1091. By 1262, Huelva—then part of the Taifa of Niebla—was taken by Alfonso X of Castile. From 1265 onward, Huelva enjoyed an exemption from the portazgo tribute, portage tax (a customs duty).

Following the Christian conquest, the town became a realengo ('royal demesne') for a brief spell until it was ceded in Lordship to Admiral  in 1293 by Sancho IV of Castile. After a spell during which Huelva was probably controlled by Seville, the tenency of the lordship was passed to several lords, including Alonso Meléndez de Guzmán—brother of Eleanor de Guzmán—(in 1338) and Juan Alfonso de la Cerda. Huelva, again a realengo for a short time during the reign of Peter I, saw its privileges confirmed and was granted the right to choose the alcalde and the alguacil in 1351. The lordship was soon given to King's Mistress María de Padilla.

Early modern history 

It suffered substantial damage in the 1755 Lisbon earthquake.

Huelva became a leading fishing town in Andalusia in the 16th century (thriving in the sardine and tuna markets). The town became a provincial capital in 1833.

Modern history 
Mines in the countryside send copper and pyrite to the Huelva's port for export. From about 1873, the greatest locally was Rio Tinto, the British mining firm, catered to technological breakthroughs on both sides of the Atlantic using copper of high quality such as for electrics and alloys.

Huelva acquired the status of city (ciudad) by means of a royal decree from 17 September 1876.

The ore smelting caused severe sulfur dioxide pollution and were frequently accompanied by protests of local farmers, peasants and miners, allied under the anarchist syndicalist leader Maximiliano Tornet. On 4 February 1888, the Pavi Regiment of the Spanish Army opened fire on demonstrators at the village plaza of Rio Tinto. Historians estimate the number of deaths between 100 and 200. Environmentalists from and defending the nearby Nerva village referred to 1888 as the "year of shots" a hundred years later in their protests against the province government's plans to site a large waste dump in a disused mine in the 1990s.

The local football club, Recreativo de Huelva was founded in 1889 by workers of Rio Tinto Group. Nicknamed the "Decano" (dean, widower, or the feminine loan word "doyenne" being the main translation in other contexts) of Spanish football, it is the longest (active) football club in the country.

The 17–18 July 1936 military coup d'état that started the Spanish Civil War failed in the city and much of the province. However, on 27 July 500 guardias civiles rose in arms against the Republic in the city, with the authorities escaping and later being shot down. Two days later, on 29 July, a rebel column from Seville on behalf of Gonzalo Queipo de Llano took control of the city. For the rest of the conflict it remained to the rear of the zone controlled by the Rebel faction. The ensuing Francoist repression took a heavy toll, with an estimated total of  deaths all over the province for the rearguard and post-war repression.

During World War II, the city was a hub of espionage activities led by members of the large British and German communities. German activity centered on reporting British shipping moving in and out of the Atlantic. Most famously, the outskirts was where Operation Mincemeat allowed a body carrying false information to wash ashore.

25 years after the city was declared a Polo de Desarrollo Industrial ("Pole of Industrial Development") in 1964, the population had nearly doubled.

On 11 October 2005, Hurricane Vince made landfall in Huelva as a tropical/subtropical depression.

Geography 
Location

Huelva is in the Southwest of the Iberian Peninsula, in the Gulf of Cádiz, facing the Atlantic Ocean. The coastline straddling along the Gulf of Cádiz is known as Costa de la Luz. The city lies next to the estuary formed by the confluence of the Odiel and Tinto, sandwiched in between both rivers.

A rather wide estuary in ancient times, the estuary of Huelva progressively silted up to a large extent.

Transportation
Huelva is home to Grupo Damas, a provincial bus company. Huelva's train station is now a shadow of its former self, and exists on a spur line. There are no trains to Portugal. The Port of Huelva hosts Naviera Armas' ferry Volcan del Teide, on which one can travel weekly to Arrecife and Las Palmas de Gran Canaria.

Huelva does not have an airport. The closest airports to the city are Faro Airport (93 km as the crow flies) and Seville Airport (95 km).

Demographics
Huelva had a population of 149,410 in 2010.  The city experienced a population boom in the nineteenth century, due to the exploitation of mineral resources in the area, and another with the construction of the Polo de Desarrollo in the 1960s. It had a population of 5,377 inhabitants in 1787, which had risen to only 8,519 by 1857. From 1887, the city experienced rapid growth, reaching 21,539 residents in 1900, 56,427 in 1940, and 96,689 in 1970. Rapid expansion occurred in the following decades and the population reached 141,479 by 1991.

In the last ten years, immigration both from abroad and from the surrounding area have sustained population growth. In 2007, the city reached the 145,000 mark, while the metropolitan area had nearly 232,000 inhabitants, encompassing the surrounding areas of Aljaraque, Moguer, San Juan del Puerto, Punta Umbría, Gibraleón, and Palos de la Frontera. The 2006 census recorded a foreign population of almost 5,000 people in the urban centre, the majority of whom were of Moroccan origin.

Climate
Huelva and its metropolitan area have a Mediterranean climate (Köppen: Csa), characterized by mild and wet winters and long warm to hot and dry summers. Extreme temperatures have been  recorded on 25 July 2004 and  recorded on 28 January 2005 at Ronda Este. Huelva is warmer than places on the immediate coastline, with cooler maritime air warming up in summer over the river delta.

Artists
The most well-known artists in Huelva have been: the poet and winner of the Nobel Prize in Literature Juan Ramón Jiménez, the sculptor Antonio León Ortega, the writer Nicolas Tenorio Cerero and the painter Daniel Vázquez Díaz.
Other outstanding artists from Huelva include the painters José Caballero, Pedro Gómez y Gómez, Antonio Brunt, Mateo Orduña Castellano, Pablo Martínez Coto, Manuel Moreno Díaz, Juan Manuel Seisdedos Romero, Francisco Doménech, Esperanza Abot, José María Labrador, Sebastián García Vázquez, Pilar Barroso, Juan Carlos Castro Crespo, Lola Martín, Antonio Gómez Feu, Rafael Aguilera, and Florencio Aguilera Correa. Miguel Báez y Espuny , called el Litri, is a retired bullfighter very famous from Huelva, his son, named Miguel Báez Spínola, was also a very renowned bullfighter retired in 1999.

Events
 Carnaval, fiesta
 Festival de Cine Iberoamericano de Huelva
 Columbian Festivals, fiesta first week of August
 Fiestas de la Cinta, between 3–8 September
 San Sebastián, festival 20 January
 Semana Santa (Easter Week)
 Virgen de la Cinta, fiesta 8 September
 El Rocio Romeria pilgrimage, every seventh August, a statue of the Virgin of el Rocio travels at night from El Rocio to Almonte.

Nearby
Near Huelva lay Herculis Insula, mentioned by Strabo (iii. p. 170), called  by Steph. B. (s. v.), now Isla Saltés ("Saltes Island").

Notable people
 

Cinta Pérez (born 1985), former footballer

Twin towns – sister cities

Huelva is twinned with:
 Borgomezzavalle, Italy
 Cádiz, Spain
 Faro, Portugal
 Houston, United States
 Vancouver, Canada

See also
 Costa de la Luz
 Tourist Mining Train
 Riotinto Railway
 Rio Tinto Company Limited

References
Informational notes

Citations

Bibliography

References

External links

 Información sobre la Sierra de Aracena
 Huelva – Sistema de Información Multiterritorial de Andalucía
 City of Huelva Andalucia Destination
  Huelva municipal government Official Website 
 City of Huelva Andalucia Destination
 Port Authority of Huelva Official web page with information about the port, its history and technical characteristics.
 Maps

 Guía de autores onubenses (Local writers) Juntadeandalucia.es. Juan David Ayllón Burguillo 
 Doñana Natural Park 
 Sierra de Aracena Natural Park 

 
Municipalities in the Province of Huelva
Phoenician colonies in Spain
Roman sites in Spain